Acraea cerasa, the tree top acraea, is a butterfly of the family Nymphalidae. It is found in most of south-eastern Africa.

Description

A. cerasa Hew. (53 b). The red-yellow scaling of the forewing reaches the apex of the cell, is there bounded by a transverse streak and encloses a black dot in the cell and usually also, especially in the female, discal dots, at least in 1 b and 2. Hindwing red-yellow above with transparent marginal band, much narrowed in cellules lc and 2, fully developed discal dots and, especially in the usually also with submarginal dots at least in 1 c and 2. In the female the red-yellow colour is lighter red to light yellow. - Larva above reddish with greenish dorsal line and white dots on the dorsal line and at the lateral edge of the red colour, on the 
sides olive-green, beneath light green; head black; dorsal spines dark grey; on segments 3 to 6 longer, other spines yellowish to greenish white. Pupa light orange-yellow with black dots and lines. Natal to British East Africa. 
-A. cerita E. Sharpe (60 e). Of this species only one specimen is known [then] ; it is very closely allied to cerasa and it need only be added to what has been given in the synopsis that the discal dots of the hindwing are small and in cellules 4 to 6 entirely absent. Uganda.
-A. unimaculata Smith differs in having the black dots entirely absent on both wings except for 1 or 2 in the cell of the hindwing beneath. The forewing to vein 2 or 3, the hindwing to the marginal band, scaled with orange-yellow; apex of the cell of the forewing hyaline. British East Africa. 

The wingspan is 32–38 mm for males and 37–45 mm for females.

Subspecies
Acraea cerasa cerasa – KwaZulu-Natal to Kenya east of Rift Valley
Acraea cerasa cerita Sharpe, 1906 – Uganda and possibly north-western Tanzania and eastern DRC
Acraea cerasa kiellandi Carcasson, 1964 – the highlands west of Lake Tanganyika
Acraea cerasa unimaculata Grose-Smith, 1898 – the highlands west of the Rift Valley in Kenya

Biology
Adults are on wing year round, with a peak from October to April. It is very scarce in dry months.
The larvae feed on Rawsonia lucida and Drypetes gerrardii.

Taxonomy
See Pierre & Bernaud, 2014

References

External links

Die Gross-Schmetterlinge der Erde 13: Die Afrikanischen Tagfalter. Plate XIII 60 a
Images representing Acraea cerasa at Bold
Images representing Acraea cerasa cerita at Bold
Images representing Acraea unimaculata at Bold

Butterflies described in 1861
cerasa
Butterflies of Africa
Taxa named by William Chapman Hewitson